B. Raja Ravi Varma is an Indian politician and former Member of Parliament elected from Tamil Nadu. He was elected to the Lok Sabha from Pollachi constituency as an Anna Dravida Munnetra Kazhagam candidate in 1989 and 1991 election.

References 

All India Anna Dravida Munnetra Kazhagam politicians
India MPs 1989–1991
India MPs 1991–1996
Dravida Munnetra Kazhagam politicians
Living people
Lok Sabha members from Tamil Nadu
People from Coimbatore district
Year of birth missing (living people)